Atlanta Nagendra is a screenwriter and director. His first film as a producer was Jokefalls. Nagendra is a software engineer turned film maker based in Atlanta, United States. Besides an engineering degree in computer-science, Nagendra has completed film making courses with emphasis on screenwriting, editing and direction.

Early life and education
Nagendra was interested in film making while he was studying computer science engineering at Bangalore Institute of Technology, Bangalore University. He went to the US to continue his work as software engineer before venturing into film making.

Film career
Nagendra started his career with Jokefalls, a Kannada comedy. The movie was successful and ran for 175 days. Nagendra's second movie is a Kannada comedy film titled Rambo. Nagendra has partnered with actor Sharan for this venture. Rambo was one of the top albums 2012 in CD sales and digital downloads. Rambo also makes it to the top 5 hits of 2012.

His third movie Mumbhai Connection is written and directed by him. It is a crime comedy thriller set and shot in Atlanta. Mumbhai Connection has been selected for eight film festivals (7th Atlanta Asian Film Festival Official Selection 2011 Atlanta, Georgia, US, Third World Indie Film Festival Official Selection 2011 San Jose California, US, 8th Dixie Film Festival Official Selection 2011 Macon, Georgia, US, 10th Urban Mediamakers Film Festival Official Selection 2011 Duluth, Georgia, US, 2nd Bronze Lens Film Festival Official Selection 2011 Atlanta, Georgia, US, 4th Bengaluru International Film Festival Official Selection 2011 Bengaluru, Karnataka, India, 7th Annual Macon Film Festival Official Selection 2012 Macon, Georgia, US, South Asian Film Festival Official Selection 2012) across the world. Mumbhai Connection has won several awards at the film festivals in the US. It was released in August 2014.

Nagendra's fourth movie is with Actor Sharan. Their early collaboration was for Rambo. They joined hands together after six years. The Movie was one of the biggest hits of 2018. It completed 100 days in several centres in Karnataka. The movie songs were massive hits on social media as well as on YouTube.

Filmography

Awards and nominations

Source

Raambo 2

Rambo

References

External links
Bengaluru international film festival 4th BIFFES
NRIPulse.com^^^Home Of The Indian American Family
NRIPulse.com^^^Home Of The Indian American Family
- YouTube
Atlanta Asian Film Festival :: Award winners

Living people
Kannada film directors
Indian male screenwriters
Film directors from Bangalore
Film producers from Bangalore
Kannada screenwriters
Screenwriters from Bangalore
21st-century Indian film directors
Year of birth missing (living people)